In science studies, boundary-work comprises instances in which boundaries, demarcations, or other divisions between fields of knowledge are created, advocated, attacked, or reinforced. Such delineations often have high stakes involved for the participants, and carries with it the implication that such boundaries are flexible and socially constructed.

Thomas F. Gieryn 
The original use of the term "boundary-work" for these sorts of issues has been attributed to Thomas F. Gieryn, a sociologist, who initially used it to discuss the problem of demarcation, the philosophical difficulty of coming up with a rigorous delineation between what is "science" and what is "non-science".

Gieryn defined boundary-work as the "attribution of selected characteristics to [an] institution of science (i.e., to its practitioners, methods, stock of knowledge, values and work organization) for purposes of constructing a social boundary that distinguishes some intellectual activities as [outside that boundary]." Gieryn suggests that Philosophers and sociologists of science, such as Karl Popper and Robert K. Merton, long struggled to come up with a criterion which would distinguish science as unique from other knowledge-generating activities, but never were able to come up with one that was stable, transhistorical, or worked reliably.

Gieryn's 1983 paper on boundary-work and demarcation emphasized that the very discussions of demarcation between science and non-science were "ideological"; that there were strong stakes for scientists to erect such boundaries both in arguing for their own objectivity and the need for autonomy.

Gieryn looked specifically at instances of boundary-work in 19th-century Britain, in which scientists attempted to characterize the relationship between religion and science as one of sharp distinction, and also looked at instances in which scientists attempted to argue that science and politics and/or ideology were inherently separate as well. Many other works by sociologists and historians have since looked at boundary-work in many other situations, usually focusing on the rhetoric of scientists (or their opponents) and their interpersonal and intersocial interactions.

Studies in boundary-work have also focused on how individual scientific disciplines are created. Following the work of Pierre Bourdieu on the "scientific field", many have looked at ways in which certain "objects" are able to bridge the erected boundaries because they satisfy the needs of multiple social groups (boundary objects).

Applications
An example of such boundary-work can be found in the study of science and literature. One instance of these studies is Aldous Huxley's book Literature and Science (see also Edward M. Jennings's (Ed.)1970 Science and Literature: New Lenses for Criticism, Anchor Books and Harry Raphael Garvin and James M. Heath's Science and Literature, Bucknell University Press)

Another application of boundary-work is in the field of management and business studies, particularly in the study of the overlaps and demarcations between market categories. A market categorization problem occurs when two or more products or services are perceived to be similar enough as to become substitutes for each other in satisfying market demand. In this case, the notion of boundary work can be used to study market boundaries. Researchers have used the notion of boundary-work to study demarcations among partially-overlapping consumer practices, such as boardsport variations (e.g, surfing, windsurfing, kiteboarding and standup paddleboarding), which started as close variations of each other but that, over time, diverged into distinct markets characterized by their own norms, market actors, rules, and gear. 

Another example of boundary-work occurred when individual scientists and scientific institutions published statements responding to the allegations of scientific fraud during the "Climategate" episode.

See also
 Conflict thesis
 Demarcation problem
 Karl Popper
 Science wars
 Trading zones

Footnotes

References

 Abbott, A.D. (1988), The System of Professions: An Essay on the Division of Expert Labor, University of Chicago Press, (Chicago), 1988.
 Fournier, V. (1999), "The Appeal to ‘Professionalism’ as a Disciplinary Mechanism", The Sociological Review, Vol.47, No.2, (May 1999), pp.280-307.
 Fournier, V. (2000), "Boundary Work and the (Un)making of the Professions", pp.67-86 in Malin, N. (ed), Professionalism, Boundaries and the Workplace, Routledge, (London), 2000.
 Fournier, V. (2002), "Amateurism, Quackery and Professional Conduct: The Constitution of 'Proper' Aromatherapy Practice", pp.116-137 in Dent, M. & Whitehead, S. (eds), Managing Professional Identities: Knowledge, Performativity and the "New" Professional, Routledge, (London), 2002.
 Geertz, C. (1973), The Interpretation of Cultures, Basic Books, (New York), 1973.
 Geertz, C. (1983), Local Knowledge: Further Essays in Interpretive Anthropology, Basic Books, (New York), 1983.

 Gieryn, T.F. (1999a), Cultural Boundaries of Science: Credibility on the Line, University of Chicago Press, (Chicago), 1999.
 Gieryn, T.F. (1999b), "John Tyndall's Double Boundary-Work: Science, Religion, and Mechanics in Victorian England", pp.37-64 in Gieryn, T.F., Cultural Boundaries of Science: Credibility on the Line, University of Chicago Press, (Chicago), 1999.
 Gilbert, G.N. & Mulkay, M.J. (1984), Opening Pandora's Box: A Sociological Analysis of Scientists' Discourse, Cambridge University Press, (Cambridge), 1984.
 Holmquest, A. (1990), "The Rhetorical Strategy of Boundary-Work", Argumentation, Vol.4, No.3, (August 1990), pp.235-258.
 Kerr, A., Cunningham-Burley, S. & Amos, A. (1997), "The New Genetics: Professionals’ Discursive Boundaries", The Sociological Review, Vol.45, No.2, (May 1997), pp.279-303.
 Koehrsen, J. (2017), "Boundary Bridging Arrangements: A Boundary Work Approach to Local Energy Transitions", Sustainability, Vol. 9, No. 3, 424.

 McOmber, J.B. (1996), "Silencing the Patient: Freud, Sexual Abuse, and The Etiology of Hysteria", Quarterly Journal of Speech, Vol.82, No.4, (November 1996), pp.343-363.
 Nielsen, A.K. & Štrbánová, S. (2008), "Creating Networks in Chemistry — Some Lessons Learned", pp.328-348 in Nielsen, A.K. & Štrbánová, S. (eds.), Creating Networks in Chemistry: The Founding and Early History of Chemical Societies in Europe (Royal Society of Chemistry Special Publication No.313), Royal Society of Chemistry Publishing, (Cambridge), 2008.
 Ramírez-i-Ollé, Meritxell (2015). "Rhetorical Strategies for Scientific Authority: a Boundary-Work Analysis of ‘Climategate’", Science as Culture, Vol. 24, Issue 4, pp. 384-411. DOI:10.1080/09505431.2015.1041902
 Reichert, D. (1992), "On Boundaries", Environment and Planning D: Society and Space, Vol.10, No.1, (1992), pp.87-98.
 Serres, M. (1982) (Harari, J.V. & Bell, D.F eds.), Hermes: Literature, Science, Philosophy, Johns Hopkins University Press, (Baltimore), 1982.
 Shapin, S. & Schaffer, S. (1985), Leviathan and the Air-Pump: Hobbes, Boyle and the Experimental Life, Princeton University Press, (Princeton), 1985.
 Silber, I.F. (1995), "Space, Fields, Boundaries: The Rise of Spatial Metaphors in Contemporary Sociological Theory", Social Research, Vol.62, No.2, (Summer 1995), pp.323-355.
 Taylor, B. (1995), "Amateurs, Professionals and the Knowledge of Archaeology", The British Journal of Sociology, Vol.46, No.3, (September 1995), pp.499-508.
 Taylor, C.A. (1996), Defining Science: A Rhetoric of Demarcation, University of Wisconsin Press, (Madison), 1996.
 Wolfe, A. (1997), "Public and Private in Theory and Practice: Some Implications of an Uncertain Boundary", pp.182-203 in Weintraub, J.A. & Kumar, K. (eds), Public and Private in Thought and Practice: Perspectives on a Grand Dichotomy, University of Chicago Press, (Chicago), 1997.
 Yearley, S. (1988), "The Dictates of Method and Policy: Interpretational Structures in the Representation of Scientific Work", Human Studies, Vol.11, Nos.2-3, (April-July 1988), pp.341-359.
 Yeates, L.B., James Braid: Surgeon, Gentleman Scientist, and Hypnotist, Ph.D. Dissertation, School of History and Philosophy of Science, Faculty of Arts & Social Sciences, University of New South Wales, January 2013.
 Yeates, L.B. (2018a), "James Braid (III): Braid’s Boundary-Work, M‘Neile’s Personal Attack, and Braid’s Defence", Australian Journal of Clinical Hypnotherapy and Hypnosis, Vol.40, No.2, (Spring 2018), pp. 3–57.
 Yeates, L.B. (2018b), "James Braid (IV): Braid’s Further Boundary-Work, and the Publication of Neurypnology", Australian Journal of Clinical Hypnotherapy and Hypnosis, Vol.40, No.2, (Spring 2018), pp. 58–111.
 Yeates, L.B. (2018c), "James Braid (V): Chemical and Hypnotic Anaesthesia, Psycho-Physiology, and Braid’s Final Theories", Australian Journal of Clinical Hypnotherapy and Hypnosis, Vol.40, No.2, (Spring 2018), pp. 112–167.
 Yeates, L.B. (2018d), "James Braid (VI): Exhuming the Authentic Braid—Priority, Prestige, Status, and Significance", Australian Journal of Clinical Hypnotherapy and Hypnosis, Vol.40, No.2, (Spring 2018), pp. 168–218.

Philosophy of science
Sociology of science
Science studies